Robert Alexander Anderson (often given as R. Alex Anderson) (June 6, 1894 – May 30, 1995)  was an American composer who was born and lived most of his life in Hawaii, writing many popular Hawaiian songs within the Hapa haole genre including "Lovely Hula Hands" (1940) and "Mele Kalikimaka" (1949), the latter the best known Hawaiian Christmas song.

Background
He was called "Andy" by his close friends.  Anderson was born in Honolulu, Hawaii. He attended Punahou School where he wrote the school's football song in his junior year and the school song in his senior year. He graduated from Cornell University in 1916, where he studied electrical and mechanical engineering and was a member of the Cornell University Glee Club. Despite lacking formal training as a composer, he wrote many songs as a student there, including "When Twilight Falls on Blue Cayuga". In 1927, he wrote his first hit song, "Haole Hula". Another well-known song of his was "Punahou" (1966).

His exploits during World War I involved flying combat missions in France. After being shot down and taken as a prisoner of war by the Germans, Anderson conceived of a daring and ultimately successful escape. This was later turned into a movie.

Although he had a very active business career, he turned his love of songwriting into a very successful avocation. While Anderson never studied theory or harmony and played a piano mostly by ear, many of his over 100 island songs have become standards. He usually composed away from an instrument, although he sometimes used a piano or ukulele to work out a melody. In 1939, as a result of a chance remark, Anderson was inspired to write his most popular song, "Lovely Hula Hands". After watching a hula dancer at a party, he heard someone say, "aren't her hands lovely?" After it was performed by Harry Owens and his band on a Honolulu radio station, it became an instant hit. It has been recorded by dozens of artists, including Bing Crosby and Alfred Apaka.

Several of Anderson's songs had movie star associations.  "Mele Kalikimaka" was first recorded by his friend Bing Crosby. "Cockeyed Mayor of Kaunakakai" was written in the 1930s for a party honoring the actor Warner Baxter. "White Ginger Blossoms" was written at the suggestion of film star Mary Pickford.

Anderson was considered the "most Hawaiian" of the hapa haole composers, following in the footsteps of songwriters like Charles E. King, using traditional Hawaiian musical qualities and themes.

Anderson died on May 30, 1995.

References

1894 births
1995 deaths
American male composers
American centenarians
Cornell University College of Engineering alumni
Punahou School alumni
Musicians from Honolulu
Writers from Honolulu
20th-century American composers
Burials at Oahu Cemetery
20th-century American male musicians
American World War I pilots
American prisoners of war in World War I
Men centenarians
World War I prisoners of war held by Germany
American escapees
Escapees from German detention
United States Army personnel of World War I